The Kalki Avatar Foundation is a spiritual organisation and the sister organisation of Messiah Foundation International. It was founded in 2000 by Younus AlGohar under the guidance of Riaz Ahmed Gohar Shahi, and bases its principles on his teachings. The Kalki Avatar Foundation's goals include raising awareness of the spiritual sciences, promoting divine love and tolerance among all peoples, and propagating the belief that Shahi is the awaited Kalki Avatar. Although headquartered in London, United Kingdom, the organisation operates in Sri Lanka, India, Nepal, Bangladesh, Pakistan, the United States of America, Canada, Australia, Japan, and South Korea as well. The organisation is particularly active in Sri Lanka.

References

External links
 The Official Website of Kalki Avatar Foundation

Riaz Ahmed Gohar Shahi
New religious movements
Interfaith organizations
International organisations based in the United Kingdom
Spiritual organizations